St. John Vianney Roman Catholic Primary School is a school in Port Loyola, Belize City, Belize, established in 1987. In 2005 it had 650 students and had launched a fundraising drive, hoping to raise Bz $600,000 to relieve overcrowding. 

There is also a St John Vianney Roman Catholic Primary School in Coventry, England, with a student body of 200 students. 

St. John Vianney Roman Catholic Primary School is located on 289 Fabers Road, Belize City, Belize

Educational institutions established in 1987
Catholic schools in Belize
1987 establishments in Belize